Renditions: A Chinese-English Translation Magazine is a literary magazine on Chinese literature in English translation published by the Research Centre for Translation (RCT) at the Chinese University of Hong Kong. It was established in 1973 and covers Chinese literature, from classical works of poetry, prose, and fiction to their contemporary counterparts, as well as articles on art, Chinese studies, and translation studies. Renditions is published twice a year, in May and in November.

History
Renditions was established by Chinese American translator George Kao who was a visiting senior fellow at RCT and contributed a number of translations to the journal himself.

Special issues 
Special issues include one on women's writing (issues 27 & 28, 1987) by writers from China, Taiwan, and Hong Kong; the first anthology of Hong Kong literature in any language (issues  29 & 30, 1988); Chinese Impressions of the West (issues  53 & 54, 2000), which presents the experience and observations of those who journeyed to the West in the 19th century, as well as the impressions and opinions of those who had never been outside China; and poems, plays, stories and paintings about Wang Zhaojun (issues 59 & 60, 2003), a Han court lady and celebrated beauty who married a Xiongnu chieftain in 33 BCE.

Other publications 
Included under the Renditions umbrella are other publications: a hard-cover and a paperback series. The hard-cover series was introduced in 1976, primarily for the library market in recognition of a core readership in the discipline of Chinese Studies in English-speaking countries. A paperback series was launched in 1986 to make high-quality translations available to a wider market. A special product introduced in 2002 is the Renditions personal digital assistant series, sold directly on-line, featuring poetry selections and city stories especially chosen for readers interested in China or travelling to Asia. Out-of-print issues of Renditions journal and titles from the Renditions paperback series are available on CD-ROM.

Online database 
An online database that is searchable by author, translator, keyword and genre, indexing all translations published in Renditions and the paperback and hard-cover series can be accessed on the Renditions website. Since January 2007, the database also includes Chinese characters for titles and authors of all listed works.

References 
 "The Renditions Experience 1973-2003", edited by Eva Hung. (Hong Kong: Research Centre for Translation, The Chinese University of Hong Kong, 2003).
 "'Renditions': 30 years of bringing Chinese literature to English readers" by Audrey Heijns, in Translation Review, no. 66 (2003).
 "The Research Centre for Translation: A Mirror of Translation Studies in Hong Kong" by Eva Hung, in Translation in Hong Kong: Past, Present and Future, edited by Chan Sin-wai. (Hong Kong: Chinese University Press, 2001).
 "University Spearheads Literature’s Export Drive" Vincent Mak, in Hong Kong Standard, 20 March 1998.
 "Periodicals as Anthologies: A Study of Three English-Language Journals of Chinese Literature" by Eva Hung, in International Anthologies of Literature in Translation, edited by Harald Kittel. (Berlin: Erich Schmidt, 1995).
 "Between the Lines" by Kevin Kwong, in South China Morning Post, 30 October 1993.
 "Editing a Chinese-English Translation Magazine" by George Kao, in The Art and Profession of Translation, edited by T.C. Lai. (Hong Kong: Hong Kong Translation Society, 1975).

External links 
 

1973 establishments in Hong Kong
Biannual magazines
Literary magazines published in China
Chinese poetry
English-language magazines
Magazines published in Hong Kong
Literary translation magazines
Magazines established in 1973
Poetry literary magazines